Association football video games are a sub-genre of sports video games. The largest association football video game franchise is FIFA by Electronic Arts (EA), with the second largest franchise being Konami's competing eFootball (formerly known as Pro Evolution Soccer or Winning Eleven). FIFA is also the most successful sports video game franchise overall.

Franchises
 Adidas Power Soccer
 Captain Tsubasa
 Championship Manager
 FIFA
 Football Manager (2000s–2010s)
 Football Manager (1980s–1990s)
 J.League
 Kick Off
 Inazuma Eleven
 International Superstar Soccer
 Manchester United
 Mario Strikers
 Match Day
 On the Ball
 Pro Evolution Soccer (Winning Eleven); currently known as eFootball
 Sega Worldwide Soccer
 Sensible Soccer
 Super Sidekicks
 Tecmo Cup
 UEFA European Championship
 Virtua Striker

Arcade games
Exciting Soccer
Football Champ
Pro Soccer
Goal Kick
Soccer
Super Sidekicks
Super Sidekicks
Super Sidekicks 2: The World Championship
Super Sidekicks 3: The Next Glory
Neo Geo Cup '98: The Road to the Victory
The Ultimate 11: SNK Football Championship
Tehkan World Cup
Tecmo World Cup '90
Video Action
Virtua Striker
Virtua Striker 2
Virtua Striker 2 version '98
Virtua Striker 2 version '99
Virtua Striker 2 version '99.1
Virtua Striker 2 version 2000
Virtua Striker 2 version 2000.1
Virtua Striker 3
Virtua Striker 3 version 2002
Virtua Striker 4
Virtua Striker 4 version 2006
Winning Eleven Arcade Game Style
Winning Eleven Arcade Game Style 2003
Winning Eleven 2006 Arcade Championship
Winning Eleven Arcade Championship 2008
Winning Eleven Arcade Championship 2010
Winning Eleven Arcade Championship 2012

Computers

IBM PC compatibles
Championship Manager
Championship Manager:
Championship Manager 93/94
Championship Manager Italia
Championship Manager 2
Championship Manager 96/97
Championship Manager 97/98
Championship Manager 3
Championship Manager: Season 99/00
Championship Manager: Season 00/01
Championship Manager: Season 01/02
Championship Manager 4
Championship Manager: Season 03/04
Championship Manager 5
Championship Manager Online
Championship Manager 2006
Championship Manager 2007
Championship Manager 2008
Championship Manager 2010
Championship Manager World Challenge
Championship Manager 2011
Championship Manager: World of Football

FIFA
FIFA International Soccer
FIFA Soccer 96
FIFA 97
FIFA: Road to World Cup 98
World Cup 98
FIFA 99
FIFA 2000
FIFA 2001
FIFA Football 2002
2002 FIFA World Cup
FIFA Football 2003
FIFA Football 2004
FIFA Football 2005
FIFA 06
2006 FIFA World Cup
FIFA 07
FIFA 08
FIFA 09
FIFA 10
FIFA 11
FIFA 12
UEFA Euro 2012 (DLC)
FIFA 13
FIFA 14
2014 FIFA World Cup
FIFA 15
FIFA 16
FIFA 17
FIFA 18
FIFA 19
FIFA 20
FIFA 21
FIFA 22
FIFA 23

UEFA European Championship
UEFA Euro 2000
UEFA Euro 2004
UEFA Euro 2008
UEFA Euro 2012

FIFA Manager
FIFA Manager 06
FIFA Manager 07
FIFA Manager 08
FIFA Manager 09
FIFA Manager 10
FIFA Manager 11
FIFA Manager 12
FIFA Manager 13
FIFA Manager 14
FIFA Manager 15

Football Manager
Football Manager 2005
Football Manager 2006
Football Manager 2007
Football Manager 2008
Football Manager 2009
Football Manager 2010
Football Manager 2011
Football Manager 2012
Football Manager 2013
Football Manager 2014
Football Manager 2015
Football Manager 2016
Football Manager 2017
Football Manager 2018
Football Manager 2019
Football Manager 2020
Football Manager 2021
Football Manager 2022

Global Soccer Manager
Global Soccer Manager 2017
Global Soccer Manager 2018
Global Soccer Manager 2019

Premier Manager
Premier Manager 98
Premier Manager: Ninety Nine
Premier Manager 2000
Premier Manager 2002/2003 Season
Premier Manager 2003–04
Premier Manager 2004–2005
Premier Manager 2005–2006
Premier Manager 2006–2007
Premier Manager 08
Premier Manager 09
Premier Manager 10
Premier Manager
Premier Manager 2012

Pro Evolution Soccer
Pro Evolution Soccer 3
Pro Evolution Soccer 4
Pro Evolution Soccer 5
Pro Evolution Soccer 6
Pro Evolution Soccer 2008
Pro Evolution Soccer 2009
Pro Evolution Soccer 2010
Pro Evolution Soccer 2011
Pro Evolution Soccer 2012
Pro Evolution Soccer 2013
Pro Evolution Soccer 2014
Pro Evolution Soccer 2015
Pro Evolution Soccer 2016
Pro Evolution Soccer 2017
Pro Evolution Soccer 2018
Pro Evolution Soccer 2019
eFootball PES 2020

The F.A. Premier League Football Manager
The F.A. Premier League Football Manager 99
The F.A. Premier League Football Manager 2000
The F.A. Premier League Football Manager 2001
The F.A. Premier League Football Manager 2002

Total Club Manager
Total Club Manager 2003
Total Club Manager 2004
Total Club Manager 2005
1-0 Soccer Manager
Action Soccer
Actua Soccer
Complete Onside Soccer
European Championship 1992
European Superleague
FIFA Online 2
FIFA Soccer Manager
Football Story
Gazza II
Goal 94
iSoccer
I Am Playr
International Superstar Soccer 3
Kick Off 2002
Liverpool (video game)
LMA Manager 2007
Manager, The
Manchester United (video game series)
Mundial de Fútbol
One-Nil
One-Nil '95
One-Nil '96
PC Fútbol
Sensible Soccer 2006
Sensible World of Soccer
Soccer Wizard
Super Match Soccer
The Soccer Game
The Soccer Game 2
UEFA Champions League 2006–2007
Urban Freestyle Soccer

Macintosh
Football Manager
Football Manager 2021
Football Manager 2022

Amiga
Amiga Soccer
Championship Manager
Championship Manager 93/94
Championship Manager Italia
David Oakley Soccer
Goal!
Empire Soccer
Football Director II
Football Director II v2
Football Glory
Football Manager
Football Manager 2
Football Masters
Italia '90
Footballer Of The Year 2
Kick Off
Kick Off 2
Liverpool (video game)
The Manager
Manchester United
Manchester United Europe
On the Ball (video game)
Player Manager
Player Manager 2
Premier Manager
Premier Manager 2
Premier Manager 3
Sensible Soccer
Sensible Soccer v1.1
Sensible World of Soccer
Sierra Soccer
Striker
Total Football
Ultimate Soccer Manager
Wembley International Soccer

Commodore 64
International Soccer
Peter Shilton's Handball Maradona
Emlyn Hughes International Soccer
Microprose Soccer
World Cup Carnival

ZX Spectrum
11-a-Side Soccer
2 Player Soccer Squad
4 Soccer Simulators
Adidas Championship Football
Advanced Soccer Simulator
Big Match Soccer
Bobby Charlton's Soccer
Boss, The
Brian Clough's Football Fortunes
Championship Soccer
Cup Football
The Double
Emlyn Hughes International Soccer
European 5-a-Side
European Soccer Challenge
European Superleague
F.A. Cup Football
Fighting Soccer
Five A Side Soccer
Football Champions
Football Club
Football Director
Football Director 2: Player Super League
Football Director II
Footballer of the Year
Footballer of the Year 2
Footballer, The
Football Fever
Football Glory
Football Manager
Football Manager World Cup Edition
Football Manager 2
Football Manager 3
Gary Lineker's Superstar Soccer
Gazza's Super Soccer
Graeme Souness Soccer Manager
Indoor Soccer
International Match Day
Italia '90 - World Cup Soccer
Jimmy's Soccer Manager
Kenny Dalglish Soccer Manager
Kenny Dalglish Soccer Match
League Challenge
Match Day
Match Day II
MicroProse Soccer
Multi-Player Soccer Manager
Peter Beardsley's International Football
Peter Shilton's Handball Maradona
Professional Footballer
Professional Soccer
Soccer Boss
Soccer Club Boss
Soccer Director
Soccer Mania
Soccer Rematch
Soccer Rivals
Soccer Spectacular
Soccer Squad, The
Soccer Star
Soccer Stars
Soccer Supremo
Star Soccer
Superleague Soccer
Super Soccer
Stickman Soccer
World Championship Soccer
World Cup Football
World Cup Soccer
World of Soccer
World Soccer
World Soccer League
Your Team
Treble Champions
ZX Football Manager 2005

Amstrad CPC
Peter Shilton's Handball Maradona

Nintendo
Note: The consoles in chronological order (divided into handhelds and home consoles), while individual game series are apathetical

Game Boy
FIFA International Soccer
FIFA Soccer 96
FIFA 97
FIFA: Road to World Cup 98
Goal! 
International Superstar Soccer
Matthias Sammer Soccer
Nintendo World Cup
Soccer
Soccer Mania
World Cup 98

Game Boy Color
David Beckham Soccer
FIFA 2000
International Superstar Soccer 99
International Superstar Soccer 2000
O'Leary Manager 2000
Ronaldo V-Football

Game Boy Advance
2006 FIFA World Cup
Alex Ferguson's Player Manager 2002
David Beckham Soccer
Disney Sports Soccer
FIFA Football 2003
FIFA Football 2004
FIFA Football 2005
FIFA 06
FIFA 07
Football Mania
Go! Go! Beckham! Adventure on Soccer Island
International Superstar Soccer
J-League Pro Soccer Club wo Tsukurou! Advance
J-League Winning Eleven Advance 2002
Monster Battle Soccer
O'Leary Manager 2000
Premier Manager 2003–04
Premier Manager 2004–2005
Premier Manager 2005–2006
Soccer Kid
Steven Gerrard's Total Soccer 2002
Total Soccer Manager
Ultimate Beach Soccer
XS Jr. League Soccer
Winning Eleven Advance
Zidane: Football Generation 2002

Nintendo DS
2006 FIFA World Cup
FIFA 06
FIFA 07
FIFA 08
FIFA 09
FIFA 10
FIFA 11
FIFA Street 2
FIFA Street 3
Pro Evolution Soccer 6
Pro Evolution Soccer 2008

Nintendo 3DS
FIFA 12
FIFA 13
FIFA 14
FIFA 15
Mario Sports Superstars
Pro Evolution Soccer 2012
Pro Evolution Soccer 2013
Pro Evolution Soccer 2014

Nintendo Entertainment System
Goal! (video game)
Goal Two! (video game)
Kick and Run
Kick Off
Konami Hyper Soccer
Nintendo World Cup
Power Soccer
Soccer
Tecmo Cup Soccer
Top Striker
Ultimate League Soccer
World Trophy Soccer

Super Nintendo Entertainment System/Super Famicom
Ace Striker
Battle Soccer: Field no Hasha
Battle Soccer 2
Capcom's Soccer Shootout
Captain Tsubasa 3: Koutei no Chousen
Captain Tsubasa 4: Pro no Rival Tachi
Captain Tsubasa 5: Hasha no Shōgō Campione
Championship Soccer '94
Champions World Class Soccer
Dino Dini's Goal
Dolucky no A.League Soccer
Elite Soccer
Fever Pitch Soccer
FIFA International Soccer
FIFA Soccer '96
FIFA Soccer '97 Gold Edition
FIFA: Road to World Cup 98
Football Champ
Goal!
Goal! Two
Hat Trick Hero 2
International Superstar Soccer
International Superstar Soccer Deluxe
J.League Soccer Prime Goal
J.League Soccer Prime Goal 2
J.League Soccer Prime Goal 3
J.League Super Soccer '95 Jikkyō Stadium
Kevin Keegan's Player Manager
Kick Off 3: European Challenge
Manchester United Championship Soccer
Mega Man Soccer
Sensible Soccer
Shijō Saikyō League Serie A: Ace Striker
Soccer Kid
Striker (video game)
Super Copa
Super Formation Soccer 94
Super Formation Soccer 95: della Serie A
Super Formation Soccer 96: World Club Edition
Super Goal! 2
Super Kick-Off
Super Soccer
Super Soccer Champ
Tactical Soccer
Tony Meola's Sidekick Soccer
Ultra League
Virtual Soccer
World Cup USA '94
World League Soccer
World Soccer '94: Road to Glory
Zenkoku Kōkō Soccer 2
Zico Soccer

Nintendo 64
FIFA '99
FIFA: Road to World Cup 98
FIFA Soccer 64
International Superstar Soccer '98
International Superstar Soccer 2000
International Superstar Soccer 64
J World Soccer 3
J-League Dynamite Soccer 64
J-League Tactics Soccer
Jikkyo World Soccer: World Cup France '98
Mia Hamm Soccer 64
Premier Manager 64
World Cup 98
World League Soccer 2000

GameCube
Disney Sports Soccer
ESPN MLS ExtraTime 2002
FIFA Football 2002
2002 FIFA World Cup
FIFA Football 2003
FIFA Football 2004
FIFA Football 2005
FIFA 06
2006 FIFA World Cup
FIFA Street
FIFA Street 2
Intellivision Lives!
International Superstar Soccer 2
International Superstar Soccer 3
Jikkyō World Soccer 2002
RedCard 20-03
Sega Soccer Slam
Super Mario Strikers
Urban Freestyle Soccer
Virtua Striker 3 ver.2002
Winning Eleven 6

Wii
2010 FIFA World Cup South Africa (video game)
Academy of Champions: Soccer
Canimals Ultimate Football
FIFA 08
FIFA 09
FIFA 10
FIFA 11
FIFA 12
FIFA 13
FIFA 14
FIFA 15
Happy Tree Friends Super Soccer
Kidz Sports International Soccer
Mario Strikers Charged
Pro Evolution Soccer 2008
Pro Evolution Soccer 2009
Pro Evolution Soccer 2010
Pro Evolution Soccer 2011
Pro Evolution Soccer 2012
Pro Evolution Soccer 2013
Real Madrid the Game
Tamagotchi Football Cup

Wii U 
FIFA 13

Nintendo Switch 
Captain Tsubasa: Rise of New Champions
FIFA 18
FIFA 19
FIFA 20
FIFA 21
FIFA 22
FIFA 23
Football Manager 2018
Football Manager 2019
Football Manager 2020
Football Manager 2021
Football Manager 2022
Football, Tactics & Glory
Inazuma Eleven: Victory Road
Legendary Eleven
Mario Strikers: Battle League
Soccer on Desk
Street Power Football

Sony

PlayStation

2002 FIFA World Cup
4-4-2 Soccer
Actua Soccer
Actua Soccer 2
Actua Soccer 3
Actua Soccer Club Edition
Adidas Power Soccer
Adidas Power Soccer 2
Adidas Power Soccer International 97
Adidas Power Soccer 98
Alex Ferguson's Player Manager 2001
Alex Ferguson's Player Manager 2002
Backyard Soccer
Chris Kamara's Street Soccer
Combination Pro Soccer
David Beckham Soccer
ESPN MLS GameNight
FA Manager
FA Premier League Football Manager 2000
FA Premier League Football Manager 2001
FA Premier League Stars
FA Premier League Stars 2001
FIFA 96
FIFA 97
FIFA Road to World Cup 98
FIFA 99
FIFA 2000
FIFA 2001
FIFA Football 2002
FIFA Football 2003
FIFA Football 2004
FIFA Football 2005
Formation Soccer '97: The Road To France
Fox Sports Soccer '99
International Superstar Soccer
International Superstar Soccer Pro
International Superstar Soccer '98
ISS Pro Evolution
ISS Pro Evolution 2
Kick Off World
Libero Grande
LMA Manager
LMA Manager 2001
LMA Manager 2002
Olympic Soccer
Onside Soccer
Player Manager
Premier Manager 98
Premier Manager 99
Premier Manager 2000
Pro Evolution Soccer
Pro Evolution Soccer 2
Pro: Foot Contest 98
Puma Street Soccer
Ronaldo V-Football
Sensible Soccer
Soccer Kid
Striker 96
Super Shot Soccer
This Is Football
This Is Football 2
Three Lions
UEFA Challenge
UEFA Champions League 98/99
UEFA Champions League 99/00
UEFA Champions League 00/01
UEFA Euro 2000
UEFA Striker
Viva Football
World Cup 98
World League Soccer 98
World League Soccer 99 (Michael Owen)
World Soccer Jikkyo Winning Eleven 4
World Soccer Winning Eleven 2002
XS Junior League Soccer

PlayStation 2
Alex Ferguson's Player Manager 2001
Championship Manager 5
Championship Manager 2006
Championship Manager 2007
Club Football 2004
Club Football 2005
David Beckham Soccer
ESPN MLS ExtraTime 2002
FIFA 2001
FIFA Football 2002
FIFA Football 2003
FIFA Football 2004
FIFA Football 2005
FIFA 06
FIFA 07
FIFA 08
FIFA 09
FIFA 10
FIFA 11
FIFA 12
FIFA 13
FIFA 14
FIFA Street
FIFA Street 2
Football Generation
Football Mania
Football Kingdom: Trial Edition
International Superstar Soccer
International Superstar Soccer 2
International Superstar Soccer 3
J.League Winning Eleven Tactics
Let's Make A Soccer Team!
LMA Manager 2002
LMA Manager 2003
LMA Manager 2004
LMA Manager 2005
LMA Manager 2006
LMA Manager 2007
Premier Manager 2002/2003 Season
Premier Manager 2003–04
Premier Manager 2004–2005
Premier Manager 2005–2006
Premier Manager 2006–2007
Premier Manager 08
Premier Manager 09
Pro Evolution Soccer
Pro Evolution Soccer 2
Pro Evolution Soccer 3
Pro Evolution Soccer 4
Pro Evolution Soccer 5
Pro Evolution Soccer 6
Pro Evolution Soccer 2008
Pro Evolution Soccer 2009
Pro Evolution Soccer 2010
Pro Evolution Soccer 2011
Pro Evolution Soccer 2012
Pro Evolution Soccer 2013
Pro Evolution Soccer 2014
Pro Evolution Soccer Management
Sega Soccer Slam
Sensible Soccer 2006
Sven-Göran Eriksson's World Challenge
Sven-Göran Eriksson's World Manager
This is Football 2002
This is Football 2003
This is Football 2004
This is Football 2005
Total Club Manager 2004
Total Club Manager 2005
UEFA Champions League 2006–2007
UEFA Euro 2004
UEFA Euro 2008
Ultimate Beach Soccer
Urban Freestyle Soccer
Virtua Pro Football

PlayStation 3

2010 FIFA World Cup South Africa
2014 FIFA World Cup Brazil
FIFA 08
FIFA 09
FIFA 10
FIFA 11
FIFA 12
FIFA 13
FIFA 14
FIFA 15
FIFA 16
FIFA 17
FIFA 18
FIFA 19
FIFA Street 3
FIFA Street 4
Premier Manager 2012
Pro Evolution Soccer 2008
Pro Evolution Soccer 2009
Pro Evolution Soccer 2010
Pro Evolution Soccer 2011
Pro Evolution Soccer 2012
Pro Evolution Soccer 2013
Pro Evolution Soccer 2014
Pro Evolution Soccer 2015
Pro Evolution Soccer 2016
Pro Evolution Soccer 2017
Pro Evolution Soccer 2018
Pure Football
UEFA Euro 2008

PlayStation Portable

Championship Manager 2007
Championship Manager PSP
FIFA Football 2005
FIFA 06
FIFA 07
FIFA 08
FIFA 09
FIFA 10
FIFA 11
FIFA 12
FIFA 13
FIFA 14
Football Manager 2006
Pro Evolution Soccer 5
Pro Evolution Soccer 6
Pro Evolution Soccer 2008
Pro Evolution Soccer 2009
Pro Evolution Soccer 2010
Pro Evolution Soccer 2011
Pro Evolution Soccer 2012
Pro Evolution Soccer 2013
Pro Evolution Soccer 2014
UEFA Champions League 2006–2007
World Tour Soccer

PlayStation Vita
Dino Dini's Kick Off Revival 
FIFA 12
FIFA 13
FIFA 14
FIFA 15
Football Manager 2014
Pro Evolution Soccer 2013

PlayStation 4

Active Soccer 2 DX
Captain Tsubasa: Rise of New Champions
eFootball PES 2020
eFootball 2022
Dino Dini's Kick Off Revival
FIFA 14
FIFA 15
FIFA 16
FIFA 17
FIFA 18
FIFA 19 
FIFA 20
FIFA 21
FIFA 22
FIFA 23
Football, Tactics & Glory
Inazuma Eleven: Victory Road
Legendary Eleven
Pro Evolution Soccer 2015
Pro Evolution Soccer 2016
Pro Evolution Soccer 2017
Pro Evolution Soccer 2018
Pro Evolution Soccer 2019
Street Power Football

PlayStation 5

eFootball 2022
FIFA 22
FIFA 23

Sega

32X
FIFA Soccer 96

Game Gear
World Cup USA '94

Master System
Champions of Europe
Great Soccer
FIFA International Soccer
Sensible Soccer: European Champions
Tecmo World Cup '93
World Cup Italia '90
World Cup USA '94
World Soccer

Mega-CD
FIFA International Soccer
World Cup USA '94

Mega Drive/Genesis
Champions World Class Soccer
Dino Dini's Soccer
European Club Soccer
Fever Pitch Soccer
FIFA International Soccer
FIFA Soccer 95
FIFA Soccer 96
FIFA 97
FIFA: Road to World Cup 98
International Sensible Soccer Limited Edition: World Champions
International Superstar Soccer Deluxe
J-League Champion Soccer
J-League Pro Striker '93
J-League Pro Striker 2
J-League Pro Striker Kanzenban
Kick Off 3
Pelé II: World Tournament Soccer
Premier Manager
Premier Manager 97
Pro Moves Soccer
Sensible Soccer
Sensible Soccer: International Edition
Striker
Super Kick-Off
Tecmo World Cup
Total Football
Ultimate Soccer
World Championship Soccer
World Championship Soccer 2
World Cup Italia '90
World Cup USA '94
World Trophy Soccer
Genesis 6-pack

Saturn
Actua Soccer Club Edition
FIFA: Road to World Cup 98
FIFA Soccer 96
FIFA 97
Isto é Zico: Jiko no Kangaeru Soccer (interactive movie)
J.League Go Go Goal!
J. League Jikkyou Honoo no Striker
J. League Victory Goal '97
J. League Pro Soccer Club o Tsukurou!
J. League Pro Soccer Club o Tsukurou! 2
Nippon Daihyou Team no Kantoku ni Narou! Sekaihatsu Soccer RPG
Okudera Yasuhiko no Sekai wo Mezase! Soccer Kids: Nyuumon Hen
Olympic Soccer
Sega Worldwide Soccer 97
Sega Worldwide Soccer 98
UEFA Euro 96 England
Victory Goal
Victory Goal '96
VR Soccer
World Evolution Soccer
World League Soccer 98
Worldwide Soccer: Sega International Victory Goal Edition

Dreamcast
90 Minutes: Sega Championship Football
European Super League
Giant Killers
J-League Pro-Club Soccer 2
Let's Make a J-League Professional Soccer Club
Sega Worldwide Soccer 2000 Euro Edition
Sega Worldwide Soccer 2000
Soccer Tsuku Tokudai Gou J.League Pro Soccer Club o Tsukurou!
Soccer Tsuku Tokudai Gou 2: J.League Pro Soccer Club o Tsukurou!
UEFA Dream Soccer
UEFA Striker
Virtua Striker 2 version 2000.1

Microsoft

Xbox
2002 FIFA World Cup
2006 FIFA World Cup
Championship Manager: Season 01/02
Championship Manager: Season 02/03
Championship Manager 5
Championship Manager 2006
David Beckham Soccer
ESPN MLS ExtraTime 2002
FIFA Football 2003
FIFA Football 2004
FIFA Football 2005
FIFA 2003
FIFA 2004
FIFA 06
FIFA 07
FIFA Street
FIFA Street 2
International Superstar Soccer 2
LMA Manager 2003
LMA Manager 2004
LMA Manager 2005
LMA Manager 2006
Pro Evolution Soccer 4
Pro Evolution Soccer 5
Red Card 20-03
Sega Soccer Slam
Sensible Soccer 2006
Total Club Manager 2004
Total Club Manager 2005
UEFA Euro 2004
Ultimate Beach Soccer
Urban Freestyle Soccer

* backwards compatible on the Xbox 360

Xbox 360
2006 FIFA World Cup
2010 FIFA World Cup South Africa
2014 FIFA World Cup Brazil
Adidas miCoach
Championship Manager 2007
FIFA 06
FIFA 06: Road to FIFA World Cup
FIFA 07
FIFA 08
FIFA 09
FIFA 10
FIFA 11
FIFA 12
FIFA 13
FIFA 14
FIFA 15
FIFA 16
FIFA 17
FIFA 18
FIFA 19
FIFA Street
FIFA Street 3
Football Manager 2006
Football Manager 2007
Football Manager 2008
LMA Manager 2007
Pro Evolution Soccer 5
Pro Evolution Soccer 6
Pro Evolution Soccer 2008
Pro Evolution Soccer 2009
Pro Evolution Soccer 2010
Pro Evolution Soccer 2011
Pro Evolution Soccer 2012
Pro Evolution Soccer 2013
Pro Evolution Soccer 2014
Pro Evolution Soccer 2015
Pro Evolution Soccer 2016
Pro Evolution Soccer 2017
Pro Evolution Soccer 2018
Pure Football
Sega Soccer Slam
Sensible World of Soccer
UEFA Champions League 2006–2007
UEFA Euro 2008

Xbox One
eFootball PES 2020
eFootball 2022
FIFA 14
FIFA 15
FIFA 16
FIFA 17
FIFA 18
FIFA 19
FIFA 20
FIFA 21
FIFA 22
FIFA 23
Football Manager 2021
Football Manager 2022
Football Manager 2023
Football, Tactics & Glory
Legendary Eleven
Pro Evolution Soccer 2015
Pro Evolution Soccer 2016
Pro Evolution Soccer 2017
Pro Evolution Soccer 2018
Pro Evolution Soccer 2019

Xbox Series X and Series S
eFootball 2022
FIFA 22
FIFA 23
Football Manager 2022
Football Manager 2023

Android & IOS

Google Play

Dream League Soccer
FIFA
FIFA Mobile
Pro Evolution Soccer
Football Manager
Football Master
Vive Le Footballl
Champion Of The Fields
Ultimate Football Club
Real Football
Mini Football

References

External links
Free Online Soccer Games at allfootballgames.co.uk
List of soccer video games at uvlist.net
The YS Complete Guide To Soccer Games at www.ysrnry.co.uk
Play Soccer Flash Games at www.sportgames247.com

Fpptball